Jeti-Ögüz Game Reserve is a protected area in Jeti-Ögüz District, Issyk-Kul Region, Kyrgyzstan. It is situated on the north slopes of the Teskey Alatoo mountain range, and occupies the basin of the river Jeti-Ögüz.

References
 

Game reserves in Kyrgyzstan
Protected areas established in 1958